Brian Awadis (born November 19, 1996), better known as FaZe Rug, is an American YouTuber who produces vlogs, challenges, gaming videos, and pranks on YouTube. He is a co-owner of FaZe Clan. He also is the most subscribed gamer in FaZe Clan on YouTube, with over 22 million subscribers.

Early life
Brian Rafat Awadis was born on November 19, 1996, in San Diego, California to immigrant Chaldean Assyrian parents from Tel Keppe, Iraq. His father owns two stores. Awadis graduated from Mira Mesa Senior High School and attended San Diego Miramar College before dropping out during his freshman year to pursue his YouTube career full-time. He can speak the Suret language, although he is not fluent.

YouTube career
Awadis and his older brother Brandon started a shared YouTube channel called "fathersonchaldean" on October 11, 2008, uploading their first video the same day. They uploaded at least three more videos by the end of 2009, at which point the channel became inactive.

Awadis created his own YouTube channel on July 11, 2012, on which he started posting short clips of Call of Duty gameplay. He was invited to join the esports team FaZe Clan, which he now co-owns, in January 2013. He uploaded his first prank video on December 7, 2014. His channel surpassed 1 million subscribers on October 9, 2015, and 10 million on September 8, 2018, thus earning him the Diamond Play Button award. It surpassed one billion cumulative video views on July 21, 2017.

In November 2019, Awadis released a song called "Goin' Live", which was accompanied by a music video released in January 2020.

He was the featured guest in season 17, episode 7 of MTV's Ridiculousness on June 24, 2020. Awadis also created a video on April 30, 2021. The video contained him with professional wrestler and son of Rey Mysterio, Dominik Mysterio, titled "Becoming a WWE Superstar for 24 Hours! (ft. Dominik Mysterio)". Mysterio trained him to become a WWE wrestler.

Awadis was invited to announce the Los Angeles Chargers 3rd round pick at the 2022 NFL Draft (79th overall). The pick was used on Baylor safety JT Woods.

Filmography

References

External links
 

1996 births
21st-century American male actors
Living people
American male actors
American people of Iraqi-Assyrian descent
American people of Iraqi descent
American YouTubers
Comedy YouTubers
FaZe Clan
Gaming YouTubers
People from San Diego
YouTube vloggers